Bekim Balaj (born 11 January 1991) is an Albanian professional footballer who plays as a striker for Albanian club Vllaznia Shkodër and the Albania national team.

Balaj started his football career with his hometown club Vllaznia and made his professional debut at the age of 17 before going on to score 17 goals in 38 games for the club before moving to Turkey to join Gençlerbirliği. After little success in Turkey he returned to Albania and played for Tirana where he scored 15 league goals in 37 games before joining Sparta Prague in the Czech Republic in January 2013.

During his time at Sparta Prague he was loaned out to Polish side Jagiellonia Białystok for the entire 2013–14 campaign where he scored 9 goals in 36 games in all competition before return to his parent club for the first half of the following season. He joined Croatian club HNK Rijeka in January 2015 for a fee of €600,000.

Balaj begun his international career with under-19 squad in 2008, and two years later also represented the under-21 squad. He made his international senior debut in 2012 and played an important role in Albania's successful UEFA Euro 2016 qualifying campaign, notably scoring the winner with a volley in the opening day against Portugal. He was selected in the 23-man squad for UEFA Euro 2016, making his debut against Romania in the final group match.

Club career

Vllaznia
Balaj joined his hometown club Vllaznia as an 11-year-old in 2002, and his father had told the youth team coach Astrit Premçi to initially test the player as a goalkeeper as he was tall for his age. However, after only a few training sessions with Balaj, the coach Premçi realised the player was an able outfield player as he was good with his feet, so he then played him as a centre forward.

He was invited to train with the first team by the coach Mirel Josa during the latter stages of the 2007–08 season, and he made his first team debut on 17 May 2008 at the age of 17 years, 4 months and 6 days in an away game against Besëlidhja, coming on as a 70th-minute substitute for Albert Kaçi in the 4–2 loss. He became a first team regular the following season, and he scored his first senior goal on his first appearances of the campaign in an Albanian Cup tie against Sopoti, before going on to make 12 appearances in all competition, 7 of which were in the league and 10 of which were substitute appearances. He was part of the Vllaznia team that finished runners-up in the Kategoria Superiore, finishing 4 points behind the eventual winners Tirana.

With the departures of Xhevahir Sukaj and James Boadu ahead of the 2009–10 season, Balaj became the club's main striker alongside Vioresin Sinani. He made his European debut on 2 July 2009 against Irish club Sligo Rovers, coming on as an 85th-minute substitute for Vioresin Sinani in the 2–1 away win.

In April 2010 he went on trial with PSG alongside fellow Albanian youth international Odise Roshi, but neither players' trial was successful. In June, he went on another trial, this time in Turkey with Gençlerbirliği and he was immediately offered a contract to join the club.

Gençlerbirliği
A top Turkish club had been tracking the young forward for most of the 2009–2010 season whilst he was at Vllaznia; the club was not identified in January 2010 as they did not make a bid, however following the huge interest shown by Gençlerbirliği S.K. in May and June, it became clear who the unnamed Turkish club was. Balaj signed a four-year contract with Gençlerbirliği on 17 June 2010. The transfer fee was reported to be around €200,000 to €300,000, which was all given to his previous club Vllaznia in Albania. Balaj's manager Dritan Gjyrezi had only been a licensed FIFA agent for a year before managing this deal; this was his first deal in his career as an agent and he hoped to be able to send more Albanian players to Turkey. Balaj signed the contract earning him €150,000 for the first year, making the deal to be worth around €600,000 for the full four years.

KF Tirana
In January Balaj received offers from both Tirana and his former club Vllaznia for a return to Albania. But after meeting with Refik Halili he signed a two-year contract for Tirana on 20 January 2011, earning €70,000 a season, which was a higher offer than Vllaznia's €50,000.

He made his debut for his new club on 3 February in a home match against Skënderbeu which ended in 0–0 draw, with Balaj coming on at the start of the second half for Gilman Lika. His first Tirana goal came in the Albanian Cup semi final second leg against Besa on 6 April, scoring the equalising goal to secure his side's place in the final. He then went on to score his first league goal just nine days later in a 6–1 thrashing of Elbasani. Despite good performances since his January move, new coach Mišo Krstičević did not pick him to start in the final of the Albanian Cup. Balaj came on for Gilman Lika in the 54th minute and helped his side win the trophy despite ending the game with ten men and Balaj himself missing a penalty in the shootout which ended 4–3 after heroics from the keeper Ilion Lika.

He scored the winning goal in the 2011 Albanian Supercup against the league winners Skënderbeu, in a match delayed and disrupted by crowd trouble. 
His first league goal of the season came on 17 September in the second week of the campaign, away at Kastrioti. Starting the game as a lone striker, he equalised for Tirana in the 48th minute and helped his side win the game 3–2, earning their first three points of the campaign. Following Tirana's first win in the league, it had become evident that Balaj and Gilman Lika had formed an effective partnership from midfield to attack, both of whom are from Shkodër.
His next goal came just four days later in the first round of the Albanian Cup against Himara of the Kategoria e Parë. He scored in the 36th minute, a penalty in the 52nd minute and finally rounded off his hattrick in the 67th minute, before Julián Rubio being forced to replace the player following a strong challenge which left him with an ankle injury. After scoring four goals in as many days he hoped he could one day force his way into the Albania national team, which he said would be a dream following a good start to the season.

Sparta Prague
Balaj joined Sparta Prague on trial in July 2012 in order for the manager Vítězslav Lavička to get a closer look at the player before the deal to join the club was finalised. Lavička started with Balaj in a friendly against Vlašim on 17 July. Balaj started the game brightly, getting close to scoring with a header in the 5th minute, and eventually scoring in the 19th minute with a powerful shot on goal from just outside the 18-yard box to put Sparta Prague 3–0 up. He was substituted at half time and the game was won by Sparta Prague 5–0. After the friendly he returned to Albania to sort out his contract with KF Tirana, who did not want him to leave unless they received a fee of €100,000, with Sparta Prague only offering half that sum because Bala's deal with KF Tirana was due to expire in January 2013.

On 4 October 2012, Balaj scored an historical goal in his career at UEFA Europa League against Athletic Bilbao, a match valid for group stage finished in the victory 3–1.

Loan to Jagiellonia
On 8 July 2013 he moved on loan for a year to Polish side Jagiellonia Białystok in the Ekstraklasa. He scored his 3rd goal on 9 August 2013 against Wisła Kraków in the 90'+3 to give his team the 1–1 draw. Balaj scored twice against Ruch Chorzów on 15 September 2013 and Jagiellonia won 6–0 with Balaj scoring two last goals to send in 5 number of goals scored in the season. Balaj scored his 5th goal on 4 November 2013 against Piast Gliwice to open the score in the 56th minute but it wasn't enough as Jagiellonia got overturned 2–1.

Return to Slavia Prague
After being returned to Sparta Prague from Jagiellonia where he was loaned for a year, he signed for the city's rivals SK Slavia Prague on 10 July 2014. He made it his debut on 26 July 2014 in the opening 2014–15 season's match against Slovácko, also his debut brought his first goal as well, as he scored the victory goal 1–2, where the match result came from behind 1–0 of the first half. On 11 August 2014 Balaj scored the opening goal in the 17th minute of the match victory 4–1 against Slovan Liberec. On 1 November 2014 Balaj came in as a substitute in the 84th minute and scored in the 87' the goal of advantage to bring his team the 3–2 victory against Příbram.

HNK Rijeka
On 7 January 2015 Balaj signed a -year contract (with a 2-year extension option) with HNK Rijeka, the runners-up in the Croatian First Football League.

On 11 February 2015 Balaj made his competitive début in Rijeka's 4–1 win against NK Lokomotiva in the first leg of the Croatian Cup quarter-final, also scoring his first goal for the club. Balaj made his league début also scoring a goal. He also scored in the Adriatic derby between Rijeka and Hajduk Split on 18 February 2015, which Rijeka won 3–0. Balaj scored his second goal in the second league game in a row and third including both championships against RNK Split in the 56th minute of the match, to give his team the 1–1 draw. During the season, Balaj scored 9 goals in 15 appearances, helping Rijeka to finished as runners-up and secure a place in the 2015–16 UEFA Europa League - Second qualifying round. Balaj also features in three 2014–15 Croatian Cup matches and scored one goal.

Balaj started a new season with Rijeka retaining his starting place on 10 July 2015 in a goalless draw against Inter Zaprešić, but got substituted off for Roman Bezjak in the 58th minute. A few days later Balaj made his European debut for Rijeka playing the full 90-minutes in the 2015–16 UEFA Europa League Second qualifying round first-leg match against Aberdeen. Balaj scored his first goal of the season in his second league appearance, against Slaven Belupo Koprivnica in a 3–3 draw. During the 2015–16 season, with 9 league goals to his account, he was one of top 10 goalscorers in the league. Balaj also scored once in the Croatian Cup.

Akhmat Grozny
On 8 June 2016, Balaj completed a move to Russian Football Premier League side Terek Grozny for €550,000, signing a three-year contract with the option of another year. He was presented on the same day, where he was handed squad number 18. Balaj made his debut for the club on 31 July in the opening league match against Krylia Sovetov, playing for 59 minutes in an eventual 1–0 home win. It took him four matches to open his scoring account as he netted the first in the 3–1 away win versus Ufa on 20 August. This was followed by another one eight days later in the 2–1 turnaround win against Rostov. However those two goals were to open the floodgates of the strikers scoring in Russia, as he managed to score two consecutive braces in the matches against Ural and Zenit Saint Petersburg, leading the team to the win against the latter. For his performances Balaj was named Terek Grozny Player of the Month for October. Starting from April's month Balaj became a bench player despite being an important player for the team playing 22 first matches as a starter. On 21 May 2017 Balaj came in as a 73rd-minute substitute during the match against Krylia Sovetov Samara and after 3 minutes he scored the 3rd team goal in a match finished in the 3–1 victory.

Balaj started the 2017–18 season by providing an assist for the 1–0 winning goal against FC Amkar Perm on 16 July 2017 scored by Léo Jabá. On 27 May 2019, Akhmat confirmed that Balaj left the club as a free agent upon the expiration of his contract.

Sturm Graz
On 26 July 2019, he signed a contract with Austrian club Sturm Graz for the term of 2 years with a 1-year extension option.

Nizhny Novgorod
On 21 July 2021, he returned to Russian Premier League and joined FC Nizhny Novgorod. On 16 January 2022, his contract with Nizhny Novgorod was terminated by mutual consent.

Boluspor
On 30 January 2022, Balaj returned to Turkey and signed with Boluspor.

Vllaznia return
On 18 January 2023, Vllaznia announced to have signed Balaj on a three-year contract, with the striker returning to his hometown club after thirteen years. Vllaznia reportedly beat the competition of Tirana and Partizani, who where also interested in signing the player. He was presented on the same day and reportedly became the highest paid player of the Kategoria Superiore, earning €12,000 a month.

International career

Youth teams

Balaj was part of the Albania U-19 squad for the qualifying stage of the 2009 European Championship, where he made his debut on 8 October 2008 against England at Ballymena Showgrounds, Northern Ireland by replacing Guido Tepshi at half time and where the match finished in the 3–0 loss for Albania. He scored his first and also Albania's only goal of the qualifying campaign, against Northern Ireland on 13 October 2008 at The Oval, Belfast in a 2–1 loss.

Balaj was called up at Albania national under-20 side by coach Artan Bushati to participate in the 2009 Mediterranean Games football tournament, which began on 25 June in Pescara, Italy. However he didn't featured in the tournament.

He was part of the under-21 side in their 2011 and the 2013 UEFA European Under-21 Championship qualification campaigns, scoring four goals in 13 matches.

Senior team
Balaj made his debut for Albania national football team on 17 February 2010 in the unofficial match against Kosovo, where he scored a goal. He received his first official call up by coach Gianni De Biasi for the friendly match against Cameroon on 14 November 2012.

Balaj was called up for the first time in competitive matches for Albania for the 2014 FIFA World Cup qualification two closing games against Switzerland and Cyprus on 11 and 15 October 2013. He made his competitive international debut in the final match of the 2014 FIFA World Cup qualification on 15 October 2013 against Cyprus where he came in as a substitute in place of Hamdi Salihi in the 87th minute of the match which finished 0–0.

UEFA Euro 2016 campaign

He scored his first competitive goal for Albania on 7 September 2014 against Portugal in the opening match of the UEFA Euro 2016 qualifier, which Albania won 1–0. Odise Roshi swung in a cross from the right which was behind Balaj, but on the turn he managed to get his foot to the ball and his right-footed volley found the bottom corner from 15 yards. Balaj described his goal as a "striker" goal.

On 21 May 2016, Balaj was named in Albania's preliminary 27-man squad for UEFA Euro 2016, and in Albania's final 23-man UEFA Euro 2016 squad on 31 May.

Balaj was an unused substitute in two first matches against Switzerland in a 0–1 loss and hosts France where they lost 2–0, then played as a substitute in the next match against Romania for Armando Sadiku which scored the goal for the historical 1–0 Albania's win. Albania finished the group in the third position with three points and with a goal difference –2, and was ranked last in the third-placed teams, which eventually eliminated them.

2018 FIFA World Cup qualification
In the 2018 FIFA World Cup qualification opening match against Macedonia on 5 September 2016, Balaj came in as a 60th-minute substitute replacing the Midfielder Amir Abrashi to play in the attack line forming a duo partnership among Armando Sadiku. In the 75th minute the match was interrupted at score 1–1 due to the weather conditions and the remained 15 minutes were played in the next day. In the penultimate minute Balaj scored a goal to give Albania's the 2–1 victory.

Personal life
Bekim Balaj spent and helped to build houses for the families of fallen National Liberation Army soldiers.

Career statistics

Club

International

International goals
. Albania U19 score listed first, score column indicates score after each Balaj's goal.

. Albania U21 score listed first, score column indicates score after each Balaj's goal.

. Albania score listed first, score column indicates score after each Balaj's goal.

Honours

Club
Vllaznia
 Albanian Cup: 2007–08; Runner-up: 2009–10
 Kategoria Superiore Runner-up: 2008–09

Tirana
 Albanian Cup: 2010–11, 2011–12
 Albanian Supercup: 2011

Sparta Prague
 Czech First League Runner-up: 2012–13

Rijeka
 Croatian First Football League Runner-up: 2014–15, 2015–16

Individual
Albanian Superliga Talent of the Season: 2011–12

References

External links
 
 
 
 
 
 
 Bekim Balaj – Euro 2016 profile at FSHF.org

1991 births
Living people
Footballers from Shkodër
Albanian footballers
Albania international footballers
Albania under-21 international footballers
Albania youth international footballers
UEFA Euro 2016 players
Association football forwards
KF Vllaznia Shkodër players
Gençlerbirliği S.K. footballers
KF Tirana players
AC Sparta Prague players
Jagiellonia Białystok players
SK Slavia Prague players
HNK Rijeka players
FC Akhmat Grozny players
SK Sturm Graz players
FC Nizhny Novgorod (2015) players
Boluspor footballers
Ankara Keçiörengücü S.K. footballers
Kategoria Superiore players
Süper Lig players
Czech First League players
Ekstraklasa players
Croatian Football League players
Russian Premier League players
Austrian Football Bundesliga players
TFF First League players
Albanian expatriate footballers
Expatriate footballers in Turkey
Expatriate footballers in the Czech Republic
Expatriate footballers in Poland
Expatriate footballers in Croatia
Expatriate footballers in Russia
Expatriate footballers in Austria
Albanian expatriate sportspeople in the Czech Republic
Albanian expatriate sportspeople in Poland
Albanian expatriate sportspeople in Turkey
Albanian expatriate sportspeople in Croatia
Albanian expatriate sportspeople in Russia
Albanian expatriate sportspeople in Austria